Heinz Heimsoeth (12 August 1886, Cologne – 10 September 1975, Cologne) was a German historian of philosophy.

Biography
Heimsoeth began his studies at Heidelberg in 1905, but soon transferred to Berlin, where he studied with Wilhelm Dilthey, Alois Riehl, and Ernst Cassirer. Due to his interest in Kant he transferred in 1907 to Marburg, where he studied with Hermann Cohen and Paul Natorp. He graduated in 1911 with a thesis on Descartes. After a year studying in Paris with Henri Bergson he was habilitated with a thesis on Leibniz.

After two years teaching at Marburg, he was appointed Professor at the University of Königsberg in 1923. In 1931 he transferred to a chair in philosophy at Cologne.

After the Nazi seizure of power in 1933 Heimsoeth himself joined the Nazi Party and was named Dean of his faculty, a position he held again in 1943/44. He became Professor Emeritus in 1954.

Works 
Die sechs großen Themen der abendländischen Metaphysik und der Ausgang des Mittelalters, Stilke, Berlin 1922, Nachdruck der unveränderten 3. Auflage, Wissenschaftliche Buchgesellschaft, Darmstadt 1987, translated into English as The Six Great Themes of Western Metaphysics and The End Of The Middle Ages, Wayne State University Press, 1994, 
Fichte, E. Reinhardt, München 1923
Metaphysik der Neuzeit, München/Berlin 1934, Nachdruck Oldenboug, München 1967
Geschichtsphilosophie, Bouvier, Bonn 1948
Metaphysische Voraussetzungen und Antriebe in Nietzsches "Immoralismus", Steiner, Mainz 1955
Windelband, Wilhelm: Lehrbuch der Geschichte der Philosophie. Mit einem Schlußkapitel "Die Philosophie im 20. Jahrhundert" und einer Übersicht über den Stand der philosophiegeschichtlichen Forschung, edited by Heinz Heimsoeth, Tübingen 1957, 
Atom, Seele, Monade. Historische Ursprünge und Hintergründe von Kants Antinomie der Teilung, Steiner, Mainz 1960
Studien zur Philosophiegeschichte, Kölner Universitätsverlag, Köln 1961
Hegels Philosophie der Musik, Bouvier, Bonn 1964 (aus Hegel-Studien Bd. 2, 1963, S. 162 – 201)
Transzendentale Dialektik. Ein Kommentar zu Kants Kritik der reinen Vernunft, 4 Bände, de Gruyter, Berlin 1966–71
Studien zur Philosophie Immanuel Kants, Bouvier, Bonn 2. Aufl. 1971, 
Nicolai Hartmann und Heinz Heimsoeth im Briefwechsel, Frida Hartmann & Renate Heimsoeth (Hrsg.), Bonn, 1978.

References
 "Heinz Heimsoeth," in: Ludwig J. Pongratz (ed.): Philosophie in Selbstdarstellungen. Vol. III. Hamburg 1975, pp. 102–132, 119.

1886 births
1975 deaths
Writers from Cologne
People from the Rhine Province
Heidelberg University alumni
Humboldt University of Berlin alumni
University of Marburg alumni
Academic staff of the University of Marburg
Academic staff of the University of Königsberg
Academic staff of the University of Cologne
German historians of philosophy
German male non-fiction writers
20th-century German philosophers